GreenGen is a project in Tianjin, China that aims to research and develop high-tech low-emissions coal-based power generation plants.

History
Funded by a group of power companies led by SOE China Huaneng Group and the Chinese government's 863 Program, the GreenGen project commenced in 2005. A key technology in the project is the integrated gasification combined cycle (IGCC), which is a coal gasification process that turns coal into a gas before burning it, hence allowing power generation to be more efficient and releasing less carbon and other pollutants.

Project
The US$1 billion project is planned to have three stages of development. The first stage involves building a 250 megawatt IGCC plant in Tianjin. Construction began in 2009 and the plant was scheduled to begin operation by 2011, but since then delayed to 2012 spring. The work has also begun on the second stage, involving a smaller pilot plant which uses both fuel cell and turbine to generate electricity while converting CO2 for industrial use at the same time. The third stage, 400 megawatt power plant with carbon capture and storage (CCS) technology, was scheduled for 2015–2020.

In 2007, the project was joined by Peabody Energy, the world's largest private sector coal company.

See also

Coal power in China

References

External links
 GreenGen

China Huaneng Group
Proposed coal-fired power stations
Energy in China
Proposed power stations in China